Maavidaakulu is a 1998 Telugu-language drama film, produced by J. Bhagavan and D.V.V. Danayya under the Sri Balaji Art Creations banner, directed by E.V.V. Satyanarayana and cinematography by Chota K. Naidu. It stars Jagapati Babu, Rachana  and music composed by Koti. This film is Ravi Babu's debut as an artist.

Plot
Pratap & Priya works as creative heads on opponent T.V. Channels AAHA & OOHO respectively, they always have a tough clash. Both of them are divorced couples. Pratap has a daughter Puppy & Priya has a son Babloo, who is fed up with single-parent love and craves for father and mother. So, Pratap & Priya decide to act as their parents when Bapineedu, Pratap's ex-father-in-law whose life ambition is to perform remarriage to his son-in-law, plays a drama and shifts them into a single house. During this period, Pratap & Priya start loving each other. The rest of the story is about how they get married.

Cast

Jagapati Babu as Pratap
Rachana as Priya
Neelam as Keerti
Kota Srinivasa Rao as Bapineedu
Brahmanandam as Lavangam
Mallikarjuna Rao
M. S. Narayana as Sundari Mogudu
Tanikella Bharani as Oho TV owner
AVS as Aaha TV owner
Ravi Babu as Muddu Krishna
Kavya as Madhuri Dixit
Namala Murthy
Priya as anchor
Ayesha Jalil
Krishnaveni as Sundari
Ragini
Radha Prashanthi as teacher
Srinija
Sri Bhavani
Master Anand Vardhan as Babloo
Baby Upasana as Puppy

Soundtrack

Music composed by Koti. Music released on Supreme Music Company.

References

External links

1998 films
1990s Telugu-language films
Indian romantic drama films
1998 romantic drama films
Films about divorce
Films about remarriage
Indian courtroom films
Films directed by E. V. V. Satyanarayana
Films scored by Koti